Gloria Gresham (born 1946)  is an American costume designer whose career began in 1980. She is perhaps best known for her work on Avalon, A Few Good Men and When Harry Met Sally....

She was nominated at the 63rd Academy Awards for Best Costumes for her work in the film Avalon.

Personal life

Gresham married veteran producer C. O. Erickson on January 1, 1987 in Indianapolis, Indiana.

Selected filmography
Annapolis (2006)
Disney's The Kid (2000)
Rules of Engagement (2000)
Liberty Heights (1999)
Ghosts of Mississippi (1996)
The American President (1995)
Last Action Hero (1993)
A Few Good Men (1990)
Avalon (1990)
Kindergarten Cop (1990)
Misery (1990)
Ghostbusters II (1989)
The War of the Roses (1989)
When Harry Met Sally... (1989)
Midnight Run (1988)
Diner (1982)
Urban Cowboy (1980)
The Wiz (1978)

References

External links

 Gloria Gresham costume design drawings, 1984-2004, Margaret Herrick Library, Academy of Motion Picture Arts and Sciences

Living people
American costume designers
Women costume designers
Artists from Indianapolis
1946 births